Meyer zum Pfeil was a prosperous Swiss patrician and noble family from Basel. It appears in Basel in the 15th century and is one of Basel's oldest patrician families, and dominated the city for several centuries together with a handful of other patrician families. The family were prominent merchants, especially cloth merchants, and many family members have served as council members and Mayors of Basel. The family name is derived from the arrow in its coat of arms. Family members used the noble honorific Junker already at the time the family appeared in Basel.

Family members include the renaissance humanist Nikolaus Meyer zum Pfeil, the politician Adelberg Meyer zum Pfeil and the Basel mayor Bernhard Meyer zum Pfeil.

References

Swiss noble families
History of Basel
Patriciate of Basel
Noble families of the Holy Roman Empire